Smicromyrme is a genus of insects belonging to the family Mutillidae.

The species of this genus are found in Eurasia and Africa.

Species:
 Smicromyrme aborlana Tsuneki 
 Smicromyrme agusii (Costa, 1884)

References

Mutillidae
Hymenoptera genera